First Presbyterian Church is a historic Presbyterian church located at Delhi in Delaware County, New York. It is a large wood-frame building on a cut stone foundation designed by Isaac G. Perry and built in 1880–1882.

It was added to the National Register of Historic Places in 2006.

See also
National Register of Historic Places listings in Delaware County, New York

References

Presbyterian churches in New York (state)
Churches on the National Register of Historic Places in New York (state)
National Register of Historic Places in Delaware County, New York
Churches completed in 1882
19th-century Presbyterian church buildings in the United States
Churches in Delaware County, New York
1882 establishments in New York (state)